Conus havanensis is a species of sea snail, a marine gastropod mollusk in the family Conidae, the cone snails and their allies.

Like all species within the genus Conus, these snails are predatory and venomous. They are capable of "stinging" humans, therefore live ones should be handled carefully or not at all.

Distribution
This marine species occurs off Cuba and Jamaica.

Description 
The maximum recorded shell length is 34 mm.

Habitat 
Minimum recorded depth is 10 m. Maximum recorded depth is 30 m.

References

 Bacallado J.J., Espinosa J. & Ortea J. (2007). Nueva especie del género Conus Linné, 1758 (Mollusca: Neogastropoda) de la costa norte occidental de Cuba. Revista de la Academia Canaria de Ciencias, 18(3-4): 117-123
 * Puillandre N., Duda T.F., Meyer C., Olivera B.M. & Bouchet P. (2015). One, four or 100 genera? A new classification of the cone snails. Journal of Molluscan Studies. 81: 1–23

External links
 The Conus Biodiversity website
 Cone Shells - Knights of the Sea
 

havanensis
Gastropods described in 1947